Shin Won-ho (born 23 October 1991) is a South Korean singer, actor and member of multinational idol group Cross Gene. He was notable for his supporting roles in television series Bachelor's Vegetable Store (2011), Big (2012) and The Legend of the Blue Sea (2016).

Filmography

Film
{| class="wikitable"
|-
! Year
! Title
! Role
! Ref.
|-
| 2012 
| Run 60 – Game Over
| Park Hong-ki
| 
|-
| 2014 
| ZEDD
| Nine
|

Television series

Variety show

Awards and nominations

Korean Hallyu Awards

References

External links
 
 

1991 births
Living people
K-pop singers
South Korean male singers
South Korean pop singers
South Korean J-pop singers
South Korean dance musicians
South Korean male idols
South Korean male film actors
South Korean male television actors
Dong-ah Institute of Media and Arts alumni
Amuse Inc. talents
21st-century Japanese singers
21st-century South Korean singers
21st-century Japanese male singers
21st-century South Korean male actors